Before Your Very Eyes was a play created by German-British team gob squad. It was originally performed in Europe, then reopened in America at New York City's The Public Theater in October 2015.

Plot
This show looks at views of life and death, from a child's perspective. A team of 7 children, (there were 2 groups of 7 children), are sat in a box made of one way mirrors, where they age until death.

Cast
American production:
Team A-
Mikai Anthony, Eloise Celine, Margalit Duclayan, Jasper Newell, Maeve Press, Matthew Quirk, Aja Nicole Webber
Team 1-
Rose Bell-McKinley, Miles Sherr-Garcia, Simone Mindolovich, Elijah Pluchino, Charlotte Beede, Meghan Chang, Keanu Jacobs

References

Belgian plays